Carlos Arturo Villegas Retana (born 3 March 1999) is a Costa Rican footballer who plays as a winger for club Deportivo Saprissa.

Club career

Deportivo Saprissa
Villegas is a product of Deportivo Saprissa and was promoted to the senior squad in 2017, under the command of coach Carlos Watson. For the start of the Summer Championship that took place on January 8, Saprissa was going to face San Carlos, with Villegas on the bench for the first time. 17-year old Villegas made his professional debut one month later, on 8 February 2017, against Belén FC, when he came on as a substitute for Anderson Leite in the 69th minute, and the result ended with an unexpected 0-1 defeat. He made a total of six appearances in that season.

On 28 February 2018 Villegas' agent, Joaquim Batica, confirmed that Villegas in March would go for a trial at the U20 squad of Brazilian team Grêmio, alongside his Saprissa-teammate Julen Cordero.

Loan to Municipal Grecia
With only seven appearances in the following two season for Saprissa, Villegas was loaned out to Municipal Grecia in January 2019 for the rest of the year. He left the club again at the end of the year, where his loan deal expired. However, he was still a part of the Grecia-squad for three games during 2020, which indicated, that the loan deal, however, had been extended. During his time at Grecia, Villegas made a total of 23 appearances where he scored one goal.

Puerto Golfito
In the summer 2020, Villegas joined Costa Rican second division club Puerto Golfito FC.

Return to Deportivo Saprissa
After a spell at Limón, Villegas returned to Deportivo Saprissa, signing a three-year deal until May 2024 on 28 July 2021.

References

External links
 
 Carlos Villegas at Grenada FA
 Carlos Villegas at Camiseta 10

Living people
1999 births
Association football wingers
Costa Rican footballers
Costa Rica youth international footballers
Liga FPD players
Deportivo Saprissa players
Municipal Grecia players
Limón F.C. players
People from Heredia (canton)